The IPSC European Handgun Championship is an IPSC level 4 championship hosted every third year in Europe.

History 
 1979 Brussels, Belgium
 1980 May Oslo, Norway
 1981 Uppsala, Sweden
 1982 Warminster, United Kingdom
 1984 Paris, France
 1985 Vienna, Austria
 1987 October 13–17, Bisley, United Kingdom
 1989 Reims, France
 1992 Barcelona, Spain
 1995 Gotland, Sweden
 1998 September 4–13, Crete, Greece
 2001 Philippsburg, Germany
 2004 Tábor, Opařany, Czech Republic
 2007 Cheval Blanc, France
 2010 September 7–18, Belgrade, Serbia
 2013 September 5–6, Barcelos, Portugal
 2016 October 3–8, Felsőtárkány, Hungary
 2019 September 9–13, Belgrade, Serbia

Champions 
The following is a list of current and past IPSC European Handgun Champions.

Overall category

Lady category

Junior category

Senior category

Super Senior category

Teams

Overall teams

See also 
 IPSC European Rifle Championship
 IPSC European Shotgun Championship

External links 
 Video: 2013 IPSC European Handgun Championship

References

IPSC Continental Championships
Match Results - 2004 IPSC European Handgun Championship
Match Results - 2007 IPSC European Handgun Championship
Match Results - 2010 IPSC European Handgun Championship
Match Results - 2013 IPSC European Handgun Championship
Match Results - 2016 IPSC European Handgun Championship

IPSC shooting competitions
European championships
Shooting sports in Europe by country